Danie van Schoor (born 30 January 1996) is a Namibian cricketer. He made his first-class debut on 13 February 2014 in the CSA Provincial Three-Day Competition tournament. He made his List A debut in the 2016–17 CSA Provincial One-Day Challenge on 15 January 2017.

In May 2019, he was named in Namibia's squad for the Regional Finals of the 2018–19 ICC T20 World Cup Africa Qualifier tournament in Uganda. The following month, he was one of twenty-five cricketers to be named in Cricket Namibia's Elite Men's Squad ahead of the 2019–20 international season.

References

External links
 

1996 births
Living people
Namibian cricketers
Cricketers from Windhoek